Amadou Ciss (born 10 April 1999) is a Senegalese professional footballer who plays as a midfielder for Amiens.

Club career
On 8 February 2022, Ciss signed with Adanaspor in Turkey.

References

External links

1999 births
People from Dakar Region
Living people
Senegalese footballers
Senegal youth international footballers
Association football midfielders
Pau FC players
Fortuna Sittard players
Amiens SC players
Adanaspor footballers
AEL Limassol players
Championnat National players
Championnat National 3 players
Eredivisie players
Ligue 2 players
TFF First League players
Cypriot First Division players
Senegalese expatriate footballers
Expatriate footballers in France
Senegalese expatriate sportspeople in France
Expatriate footballers in the Netherlands
Senegalese expatriate sportspeople in the Netherlands
Expatriate footballers in Turkey
Senegalese expatriate sportspeople in Turkey
Expatriate footballers in Cyprus
Senegalese expatriate sportspeople in Cyprus